Iglesia de Santiago may refer to:

 Iglesia de Santiago (A Coruña)
 Iglesia de Santiago (Arlós)
 Iglesia de Santiago (Benicalaf)
 Iglesia de Santiago (Gobiendes)
 Iglesia de Santiago (Jerez de la Frontera)
 Iglesia de Santiago (Sama)
 Iglesia de Santiago, Sigüenza